The 2021–22 Women's Rock Cup is a single-leg knockout tournament contested by clubs from Gibraltar, with five clubs participating (the first time since 2016). It is the 8th edition of the tournament since the Gibraltar Football Association joined UEFA in 2013.

The last pre-COVID edition of the tournament was held in 2019, with Lions Gibraltar winning their first title. The Women's Rock Cup was not held in 2020 or 2021 due to the COVID-19 pandemic.

First round
The tournament kicked off on 29 October 2021 with a preliminary round between Lions Gibraltar and Manchester 62.

Semi-finals
The semi-finals were played on 7 November 2021.

Final
The final was played on 6 December 2021.

Scorers
11 goals
 Mollie Karp (Lions Gibraltar)

7 goals
 Joelle Gilbert (Lions Gibraltar)

4 goals

 Mara Alvez (Lions Gibraltar)
 Sheralyn Orfila (Lynx)

2 goals

 Reighann Mascarenhas-Olivero (Lions Gibraltar)
 Noelle Laguea (Lynx)

1 goal

 Zoe Ballantine (Lions Gibraltar)
 Talia Gilbert (Lions Gibraltar)
 Isabella Rodriguez (Lions Gibraltar)

See also
2021–22 Gibraltar Women's Football League

References

External links
Gibraltar Football Association

Rock Cup
Women's Rock Cup
Women's Rock Cup